Bronson Cutting La Follette (February 2, 1936 – March 15, 2018) was an American Democratic lawyer and politician. He was the 36th and 39th Attorney General of the state of Wisconsin, and was an unsuccessful candidate for Governor of Wisconsin in 1968.

Family
Born in Washington, D.C., he was the son of U.S. Senator Robert M. La Follette, Jr. and Rachel Wilson Young, and the grandson of U.S. Senator Robert M. "Fighting Bob" La Follette, Sr., all of Wisconsin. He was named in memory of former U.S. Senator Bronson Cutting of New Mexico, a close family friend who died in an airplane crash in 1935.

Biography
La Follette went to Landon School in Bethesda, Maryland. He received a bachelor of arts degree in political science from the University of Wisconsin–Madison in 1958 and a law degree in 1960. He worked in private practice until 1962, when he was appointed an Assistant U.S. Attorney for the Western District of Wisconsin by U.S. Attorney General Robert F. Kennedy.

In 1964 he was elected Wisconsin Attorney General and served for two consecutive two-year terms, and later three consecutive four-year terms from 1975 to 1987. He challenged the incumbent Republican Governor Warren P. Knowles in the 1968 Wisconsin gubernatorial election and lost. He ran for and was again elected Attorney General in 1974. Despite a 1981 conviction for drunk driving, he was re-elected in 1982, and in the process became the first candidate for Wisconsin statewide office to receive one million votes. After his 1986 defeat following an ethics investigation, he retired from public service and lived in Madison.

Death
La Follette died on March 15, 2018, at the age of 82 at the University of Wisconsin Hospital, in Madison, Wisconsin.

Governor Scott Walker said in a statement: "Tonette and I send our prayers to the family of former Wisconsin Attorney General Bronson La Follette. He was a dedicated public servant for several decades."

See also
La Follette family

Electoral history

Wisconsin Attorney General (1964, 1966)

| colspan="6" style="text-align:center;background-color: #e9e9e9;"| Primary Election

| colspan="6" style="text-align:center;background-color: #e9e9e9;"| General Election

| colspan="6" style="text-align:center;background-color: #e9e9e9;"| Primary Election

| colspan="6" style="text-align:center;background-color: #e9e9e9;"| General Election

Wisconsin Governor (1968)

| colspan="6" style="text-align:center;background-color: #e9e9e9;"| Primary Election

| colspan="6" style="text-align:center;background-color: #e9e9e9;"| General Election

Wisconsin Attorney General (1974-1986)

| colspan="6" style="text-align:center;background-color: #e9e9e9;"| Primary Election

| colspan="6" style="text-align:center;background-color: #e9e9e9;"| General Election

| colspan="6" style="text-align:center;background-color: #e9e9e9;"| Primary Election

| colspan="6" style="text-align:center;background-color: #e9e9e9;"| General Election

| colspan="6" style="text-align:center;background-color: #e9e9e9;"| Primary Election

| colspan="6" style="text-align:center;background-color: #e9e9e9;"| General Election

| colspan="6" style="text-align:center;background-color: #e9e9e9;"| Primary Election

| colspan="6" style="text-align:center;background-color: #e9e9e9;"| General Election

References

1936 births
2018 deaths
La Follette family
Wisconsin Attorneys General
Lawyers from Washington, D.C.
Politicians from Madison, Wisconsin
 University of Wisconsin–Madison College of Letters and Science alumni
University of Wisconsin Law School alumni
Wisconsin Democrats
Lawyers from Madison, Wisconsin
20th-century American lawyers